Maria's Paradise is a 2019 Finnish drama film directed by Zaida Bergroth. It was screened in the Contemporary World Cinema section at the 2019 Toronto International Film Festival.

Cast
 Pihla Viitala as Maria Åkerblom
 Tommi Korpela as Eino Vartiovaara
 Elina Knihtilä as Saga
  as Salome

References

External links
 

2019 films
2019 drama films
2019 biographical drama films
2010s Finnish-language films
Finnish biographical drama films